Rhadinomyia is a genus of picture-winged flies in the family Ulidiidae.

Species
 R. burmanica
 R. conjuncta
 R. luzonica

References

Ulidiidae